Susan Tucker is a former Massachusetts Democratic State Senator and State Representative from Andover. She served in the Massachusetts House of Representatives from 1982 to 1992 and in the Massachusetts Senate from 1999 to 2011.

Education
Tucker attended Battle Creek Central High School and received a Bachelor's degree from Michigan State University.

Political career
Tucker served in the Massachusetts House of Representatives from 1982 to 1992, in the Senate from 1999 to 2011, representing the district of Second Essex and Middlesex which includes Lawrence and Andover in Essex County and Dracut and Tewksbury in Middlesex County.

On April 11, 2014, Tucker endorsed Don Berwick for Governor of Massachusetts.

Organizations
 Massachusetts Women's Political Caucus
 Massachusetts League of Women Voters
 Merrimack Valley Economic Development Council Executive Board
 Andover Industrial and Development Commission

Committees
 Housing (Chair)
 Telecommunication, Utilities & Energy (Vice-Chair)
 Elder Affairs
 Senate Committee on Ways and Means
 Economic Development & Emerging Technologies
 Financial Services

References

External links
Senate Website
 SueTucker.org

Living people
Democratic Party Massachusetts state senators
Women state legislators in Massachusetts
People from Andover, Massachusetts
Year of birth missing (living people)
21st-century American women